Austroblechnum patersonii, synonym Blechnum patersonii, is a fern in the family Blechnaceae. It is known as the strap water-fern.

It is native to eastern Australia (Queensland, New South Wales, Victoria and Tasmania), Lord Howe Island, New Zealand and the Society Islands (Tahiti).

References

Blechnaceae
Ferns of Australia
Ferns of New Zealand
Flora of Lord Howe Island
Flora of the Society Islands
Taxa named by Robert Brown (botanist, born 1773)